Sportsgirl is an Australian women's clothing chain owned and operated by Sussan.

History

1940s and 1950s
The first Sportsgirl store opened in 1948 as an alternative to its sister label Sportscraft on Swanston Street, Melbourne. The store was owned and operated by the Bardas family, who until then had no retail outlet and had been distributing their Sportscraft clothing label via department stores.

In 1956, the rent on their initial property was raised (potentially due to Melbourne being host to the 1956 Summer Olympics). The Bardas family, therefore, decided to move their store to Collins Street. They would eventually purchase this property in 1959, cementing it as the flagship store for the brand as they expanded throughout the metropolitan area.

1960s
In the 1960s, Shortsgirl emerged as a leader in the Australian fashion industry, including opening a Sydney flagship store on Pitt Street, successfully developing a brand image and a store identity that moved fashion retail away from the concept of established department stores to the concept of the lifestyle fashion boutique, using interior design, visual merchandising, graphic design, and advertising to build its fashion brand into one that appealed to the emerging youth market of the 1960s. As well as carefully choosing overseas imports, Sportsgirl sourced its fashion lines from young Australian designers, employing heavy use of print advertising and merchandising display to create a Shortsgirl identity that linked its clothing lines to a set of lifestyle values and accessories.

1970s
In the 1970s, Sportsgirl continued opening stores in locations throughout Australia. It continued its heavy use of mass advertising through print and media advertising that linked fashion with lifestyle images.

Sportsgirl adopts the developing methods of mass marketing. It capitalizes on the power of linking fashion with exciting images.

Sportsgirl advertising campaigns and its in-store magazines combine photography with slogans and lifestyle concepts.

Sportsgirl uses special events, in-store parades, and promotions to pump excitement into fashion.

Internationally acclaimed illustrator Antonio was brought to Australia by Sportsgirl, who used his drawings to promote a parade held in two circus tents.

Make-up artists Way Bandy and Regis are brought to Australia to give public demonstrations of the latest fashion looks.

Sportsgirl blazes through as one of the first fashion retailers to sell homewares and body and beauty products.

1980s
By the 1980s, Sportsgirl had over 100 stores throughout Australia.

Frontline (not to be confused with the television series of the same name) was launched as Sportsgirl's very own magazine.

The Melbourne and Sydney flagship stores opened their in-store cafes. Healthworks cafes opened in Melbourne and Sydney flagship stores. Sportsgirl picked up on the concept of Lifestyle and had in-store cafes long before other retailers. Flagship stores included an in-store travel club.

Sportsgirl cosmetics and perfumes are launched.

Sportsgirl stocks fledgling Australian designers and labels. Many of them go on to become fashion industry stars including Prue Acton, Trent Nathan, Norma Tullo, Simona, and Country Road.

Many Sportsgirl employees go on to make their mark within the industry, such as Craig Kimberley, founder of Just Jeans.

A department within Sportsgirl called Bigi the hottest in young fashion, especially in evening wear. Bigi was inspired by a line Bergdorf Goodman, the famous US department store, carries.

Many label subsidiaries to Sportsgirl are launched, including David Lawrence, Elle B, SG Essentials, Metro, and Bush Telegraph.

The Sportsgirl network is wide in Australia with over 100 stores.

1990s

In 1991, Sportsgirl opened ($180 million) Sportsgirl Centre in Collins Street. In Melbourne 1994, a change in the economic climate forces the company to sell the Sportsgirl Centre.

David Bardas left the company and it was sold to an alliance of South African company Truworths and Australian Frank Whitford, managing director of Sportsgirl.

Stores are opened in New Zealand, Singapore, Hong Kong and Thailand. Expansion continues despite difficult retailing conditions. Labels Sportscraft, Sportsgirl, and David Lawrence are split into separate stores, and new store fit-outs are implemented across Australia.

Substantial investment is made in developing the profiles of individual brands. Sportsgirl lures supermodel Claudia Schiffer to appear in the Sportsgirl parade at the Melbourne Fashion Festival.

In early 1999, Whitford's offer to buy out Truworths failed and in late 1999 the Sportsgirl Sportscraft Group was sold.

2000s

In 2000, under new management by Sussan, Sportsgirl launched a new look for its stores, with the first unveiled at the Chadstone Shopping Centre in Melbourne.

Sportsgirl launches its new connection campaign "make your way there" ditching the traditional ‘ideal women’ image for real and risqué images including tattoos, naked women on horseback, and women kissing. A revamped and irreverent Sportsgirl website experience is shared on the Internet.

In 2007, Sportsgirl launched its rewind range. It brought back some of its older pieces from the 1980s, such as the Sportsgirl logo tee, beach towels, and duffel bags.

In 2009, Sportsgirl launched the label 'Romance Was Born' in stores featuring music from the Melbourne indie/electro band Neon Knights.

In 2012, Sportsgirl displayed the "window shop", a digital strategy to allow for 24/7 shopping. In this concept, products are displayed on the shopfront's windows, and customers can scan the product's QR code with their smartphone or iPad to make an immediate purchase.

References

External links
Sportsgirl website

1948 establishments in Australia
Clothing companies established in 1948
Retail companies established in 1948
Clothing companies of Australia
Companies based in Melbourne